Coelogyne tomentosa (necklace orchid) is a species of Orchid.

tomentosa
Plants described in 1854